Asom Gana Parishad (translation: Assam People's Council,  AGP) is a state political party in Assam, India. The AGP was formed after the historic Assam Accord of 1985 and formally launched at the Golaghat Convention held from 13–14 October 1985 in Golaghat, that let Prafulla Kumar Mahanta to be elected as the youngest chief minister of the state. The AGP has formed government twice from 1985 to 1989 and from 1996 to 2001.

The party split in 2005, with former Chief Minister Prafulla Kumar Mahanta forming the Asom Gana Parishad (Progressive), but regrouped on 14 October 2008 in Golaghat.

The party won 14 seats out of 126 in the 2016 Legislative Assembly Elections; a historic win for the party. Further, it shares power with the Bodoland People's Front and Bharatiya Janata Party.

Currently it is a part of North-East Regional Political Front consisting of political parties of the northeast which has supported the National Democratic Alliance (India). The party will form an alliance with BJP in coming assembly elections as well.

History
AGP was a result of a six-year-long Assam Agitation against illegal infiltration of foreigners from Bangladesh into Assam, led by All Assam Students' Union. For years, people of Assam have been complaining against infiltration of illegal migrants from neighboring Bangladesh (East Pakistan till 1972), as they feared that it is altering the demographic, social and economic make-up of the state.

In 1979, AASU started a violent movement demanding detection of all illegal migrants in the state, deletion of their names from the country's electoral rolls, and deportation of all of them under the laws of the land. For instance, the Nellie massacre remains as one of the most barbaric incidents of independent India. This movement continued for years, and the Assembly Election was held in 1983 in this hostile environment. 

AASU then constituted the All Assam Gana Sangram Parishad (AAGSP) which consisted of representatives of various organizations including the Asom Sahitya Sabha, two regional political parties – Asom Jatiyabadi Dal and Purbanchaliya Loka Parishad, the Sadau Asom Karmachari Parishad, Asom Jatiyabadi Yuva-Chatra Parishad, Asom Yuvak Samaj, All Assam Central and semi-Central Employees’ Association etc.

Several rounds of discussions with successive governments in New Delhi led to the signing of the Assam Accord on 15 August 1985 between the AASU and the government, with the prime minister Rajiv Gandhi standing witness to it.

Following this, the State Assembly was dissolved and the Congress government headed by Hiteswar Saikia, which came to power in February 1983, was dismissed.

The Golaghat National Convention, organized in Golaghat on 13–14 October 1985 decided that a regional political party under the name and style of Asom Gana Parishad (AGP) be constituted and the Asom Gana Parishad was finally launched in Golaghat on 14 October 1985.

By that time, the previous central executive committee of the All Assam Students’ Union (AASU) was dissolved at a convention in North Lakhimpur in September, and Prafulla Kumar Mahanta, the president of the AASU, was elected the president of the presidium of the new political party. Asom Jatiyabadi Dal and the Purbanchaliya Loka Parishad also merged with AGP. Members from other organizations also joined the party.

The AGP contested the State Assembly elections held in December 1985 and swept the polls by winning 67 of the 126 seats apart from capturing seven of the 14 Lok Sabha (Parliament) seats and formed the Government of Assam. The party again formed the government in Assam after winning the elections in 1996.

Party leader Prafulla Kumar Mahanta served as the Chief Minister of Assam for two terms, first from 1985 to 1990 and then again from 1996 to 2001. Asom Gana Parishad was a part of the National Front government from December 1989 to November 1990.

Its Member of Parliament Dinesh Goswami was the Union Minister of Law and Justice in the V. P. Singh Ministry. The party was again a part of the United Front governments headed by H. D. Deve Gowda and Inder Kumar Gujral. AGP leaders Birendra Prasad Baishya and Muhi Ram Saikia were the Union Minister of Steel and Mines and the Union Minister of State for Human Resources Development respectively in the United Front governments.

The party has been marginalized in the politics of Assam. Once a formidable force, it has been sidelined by the Bodoland People's Front and the AIUDF of Badruddin Ajmal. Currently, the party has only 9 M.L.A in the Legislative Assembly of Assam.AGP was criticised by AASU for supporting CAA in 2019.

Internal Splits and Mergers
The AGP in March 1991 underwent a split when party general secretary and former Assam Home Minister Bhrigu Kumar Phukan, former Union Law Minister and MP Dinesh Goswami, former state Education Minister Brindaban Goswami, Assam Legislative Assembly speaker Pulakesh Barua and others formed the Natun Asom Gana Parishad (natun means new in Assamese). This fraction came back to the party fold in 1992.

In 2000, former Assam PWD minister and senior party leader Atul Bora (Senior) moved away along with Pulakesh Barua and formed Trinamool Gana Parishad.

After the second AGP Government's reign under Prafulla Kumar Mahanta came to an end and Congress regained power, numerous allegations were raised against him related to the corruption during his tenure, government's involvement in secret killings, and Mahanta's overall inactive leadership. These led to his demotion from being President of the party and later he was expelled from the party on 3 July 2005 after being accused of anti-party activities. Mahanta then formed his own party, Asom Gana Parishad (Progressive).

In 2008, a process started to reconcile the differences among all the breakaway fractions and to bring back everybody under the mother party umbrella to strengthen the regional party movement in Assam. Finally, on 14 October 2008, all breakaway groups reconciled in one umbrella at the historic town Golaghat. Prafulla Mahanta merged his AGP(P) with it. Atul Bora and Pulakesh Barua merged their TGP with the AGP and farmer leader and former legislator of Patacharkuchi, Pabindra Deka too merged the Purbanchaliya Loka Parishad (PLP) with it.

Splits from AGP
In 2011, firebrand youth leader Sarbananda Sonowal resigned from all executive posts within AGP and joined the Bharatiya Janata Party, due to dissatisfaction with and amongst the senior leadership of the party who were trying to forge an alliance with a party that was against the scrapping of the controversial IMDT Act. "The AGP was born out of the illegal foreigners' issue after the six-year-long Assam agitation; 855 people laid down their lives in the agitation. However, the party has failed to honor the sacrifice of the martyrs by deviating from its principles. But I have no grievances against the dedicated grassroots-level workers. Since the AGP has failed to tackle the illegal migrants' problem, I've joined the BJP keeping in mind the interest of the people of Assam and the fact that I'll be able to highlight the problems and issues of the state at the national level," Sonowal, the former AGP general secretary, said.

On 8 February 2011, Sonowal joined Bharatiya Janata Party in the presence of the then BJP National President Nitin Gadkari and senior leaders like Varun Gandhi, Vijay Goel, Bijoya Chakravarty and state BJP president Ranjit Dutta. He was immediately appointed a member of the BJP National Executive and then later on State Spokesperson of the state BJP unit, prior to his current assignment to head the state as the new president.

Again on 3 July 2013, senior party leader Atul Bora once again left the party and joined BJP.

2016-present
In May 2016, after the Bharatiya Janata Party (BJP) led National Democratic Alliance which included parties like Asom Gana Parishad and Bodoland People's Front formed its first government in Assam, and formed a new alliance called the North-East Democratic Alliance (NEDA) with Himanta Biswa Sarma as its convener. The Chief Ministers of the north eastern states of Sikkim and Nagaland also belong to this alliance. Thus, the Asom Gana Parishad joined the BJP led NEDA.

In November 2016, Atul Bora was elected for President of Asom Gana Parishad second time amending party's constitution ‘one man one post’ as he is also minister of Agriculture, Horticulture and Food Processing, Animal Husbandry and Veterinary in Sarbananda Sonowal Ministry.

In January 2019, they broke an alliance with Bharatiya Janata Party on the issue of Citizenship Amendment Bill 2019 but in March 2019 the party returned to North-East Democratic Alliance for the Lok Sabha election. As per the agreement, AGP contested on 3 seats, Bodoland People's Front at one and Bharatiya Janata Party on ten seats.

List of Chief Ministers

Members in Rajya Sabha 

 Birendra Prasad Baishya
 Bhadreswar Buragohain
 Bijoya Chakravarty
 Parag Chaliha
 Kumar Deepak Das
 David Ledger
 Dr. Jayashree Goswami Mahanta
 Dr. Nagen Saikia
 Dr. Arun Kumar Sarmah

Members in Lok Sabha 

 Parag Chaliha
 Dinesh Goswami
 Gakul Saikia
 Muhi Ram Saikia
 Bhadreswar Tanti
 Prabin Chandra Sarmah
 Keshab Mahanta
 Dr. Arun Kumar Sarmah
 Birendra Prasad Baishya
 Sarbananda Sonowal
 Joseph Toppo

See also
Golaghat Convention
Natun Asom Gana Parishad
Assamese Language Movement
Nellie Massacre
National Register of Citizens for Assam.

Notes

References

 
Political parties established in 1985
1985 establishments in Assam
Political parties in Assam
State political parties in Assam
Regionalist parties in India